Druha Miska Likarnia is a station of the Kryvyi Rih Metrotram. The station was originally part of the city's larger tram system, although it was incorporated into the metrotram route along with four other stations on 25 May 2012. It is a station on the metrotram's third route, running from Zarichna to Kiltse KMK.

The tram line reorganization was initiated in order to eliminate the need for transfer stops for the inhabitants traveling from Kryvyi Rih's northern neighborhoods to the southern end of town, near the ArcelorMittal Kryvyi Rih plant.

The Druha Miska Likarnia station is located above ground, with platforms running on either side of the metrotram's tracks. The station is named after the Druha Miska Likarnia (or the city's second hospital).

See also
 Miska Likarnia (Kryvyi Rih Metrotram)

References

External links
 

Kryvyi Rih Metrotram stations
Railway stations opened in 2012